Maxwell John Carpendale (1865–1941) was an Irish rugby international. He won four caps between 1886 and 1888.

Notes

References
Maxwell Carpendale at Scrum.com
IRFU Profile

1865 births
1941 deaths
Irish rugby union players
Ireland international rugby union players
Monkstown Football Club players
Rugby union three-quarters